Hugh Roy (28 September 1935 – 23 May 2014) was a South African cricketer. He played fourteen first-class matches for Western Province between 1952 and 1957.

References

External links
 

1935 births
2014 deaths
South African cricketers
Western Province cricketers
Cricketers from Newcastle upon Tyne
English emigrants to South Africa